Ballistic Missile Range Safety Technology (BMRST) is a mobile system designed and built by Honeywell International in Clearwater Florida, to monitor and provide space-vehicle position data during launches. The BMRST system consists of a control center van and two trailer-mounted tracking antennas. All data processing and range safety displays are housed in the control center; the antennas are designed to receive data from launched rockets and space vehicles and transmit the information back to the control center. From the control center, the Range Safety Officer will also be able to assist in destroying an off-course rocket or launch vehicle for safety reasons.

The tracking antennas combine the ability to receive an S-band telemetry data signal with the ability to transmit high-power UHF Command Destruct tones. Each of the antenna systems consists of a 5.4-meter reflector, elevation over azimuth pedestal, and a specialized telemetry tracking/UHF feed.

The system is currently operated by the Florida Air National Guard at Cape Canaveral Air Force Station, Florida. The system is capable of being transport by land, sea and C-5 Galaxy, C-17 military cargo aircraft.

The BMRST system is similar in design to the Range Safety and Telemetry System (RSTS) being used at the Kodiak Launch Center in Alaska.

See also 
BMRST Interior
BMRST Video
Safety at the Kodiak Launch Complex (RSTS)

External links and sources 
Florida Air Guard Receives New Space-Launch Tracking System
Honeywell Range Safety
Honeywell To Provide Ballistic Missile Range Safety Technology System For The U.S. Air Force Rocket System Launch Program (October 2002)
Contract from Honeywell Space Systems for Ballistic Missile Range Safety System 
Challenges in Acceptance/Licensing of a Mobile Ballistic Missile Range Safety Technology (BMRST) System (PDF File)

Notes and references 

Telemetry